Euryrhynchidae is a family of crustaceans belonging to the order Decapoda.

Genera:
 Eurindicus De Grave, Arjun & Raghavan, 2018
 Euryrhynchina Powell, 1976
 Euryrhynchoides Powell, 1976
 Euryrhynchus Miers, 1878

References

Palaemonoidea
Decapod families